The Main Plot was an alleged conspiracy of July 1603 by English courtiers to remove King James I from the English throne and to replace him with his cousin Lady Arbella Stuart. The plot was supposedly led by Lord Cobham and funded by the Spanish government. In a state trial, the defendants accused of involvement in the Main Plot were tried along with those of the Bye Plot. It is referred to as the "main" plot, because at the time it was presented as the principal ("main") plot of which the secondary (or "bye") plot was a minor component.

In the version of the plot presented at trial, Cobham was negotiating with the Count of Aremberg to contact the Spanish court in order to obtain a very large sum of money (approximately £160,000). He was to travel to Brussels, then to Spain, collect the money, and go back to England via Jersey, where Sir Walter Raleigh was governor. Raleigh and Cobham were then to divide up the money and decide how best to spend it in furtherance of sedition.

Investigation
The plot was discovered during an investigation of the Bye Plot in which Sir George Brooke, the brother of Lord Cobham, was implicated. The effort of examining the evidence gathered from suspects questioned in the far-fetched Bye Plot fell to William Waad. He teased out the "main" or serious plot, as he saw it and involving the highly placed Raleigh, from the rest of the "bye" plot; and presented his findings to Sir Robert Cecil and the Privy Council.

Consequences
Cobham and Raleigh were both imprisoned in the Tower of London as was Sir Griffin Markham. Raleigh was released after thirteen years, but was eventually executed in 1618. The sick Cobham was released in the same year, dying some months later.

See also
Throckmorton Plot
Gunpowder Plot

References

External links
Lex Scripta account of the plots

History of Catholicism in England
Political history of England
Religion and politics
1603 in England
17th century in England
17th-century coups d'état and coup attempts
James VI and I